Eric N. Jacobsen (born February 22, 1960, in New York City, New York) is the Sheldon Emery Professor of Chemistry and former Chair of the Department of Chemistry and Chemical Biology at Harvard University.  He is a prominent figure in the field of organic chemistry and is best known for the development of the Jacobsen epoxidation and other work in selective catalysis.

Early life and education 
Jacobsen was born on February 22, 1960, in New York City. Jacobsen attended New York University for his undergraduate studies, graduating with his B.S. in 1982. He attended the University of California, Berkeley for graduate school, earning his Ph.D. in 1986 under the tutelage of Robert G. Bergman. He subsequently joined the laboratory of Barry Sharpless, then at MIT, as an NIH Postdoctoral Fellow. He began his independent career as an assistant professor at the University of Illinois at Urbana-Champaign in 1988. In 1993 he moved to Harvard as a full Professor.

Notable contributions 
Jacobsen has developed catalysts for asymmetric epoxidation, hydrolytic kinetic resolution and desymmetrization of epoxides, asymmetric pericyclic reactions, and asymmetric additions to imines.

Awards 
 Bristol-DTC-Syngenta Award (2013)
 Remsen Award (2013)
 Fannie–Cox Teaching Award, Harvard University (2012)
 Chirality Medal (2012)
 Nagoya Gold Medal Prize (2011)
 GSK Scholar Award (2011)
 Kosolapoff Award, Auburn Section ACS (2011)
 The Ryoji Noyori Prize (2011)
 Janssen Pharmaceutica Prize for Creativity in Organic Synthesis (2010)
 Yamada–Koga Prize
 election to the National Academy of Sciences (2008)
 ACS H.C. Brown Award for Synthetic Methods (2008)
 Alan R. Day Award (2007)
 Mitsui Catalysis Award (2005)
 election to the American Academy of Arts & Sciences (2004)
 AIC Chemical Pioneer Award (2004)
 Phi Beta Kappa Teaching Prize (2003)
 NIH MERIT Award (2002)
 ACS Award for Creativity in Synthetic Organic Chemistry (2001)
 Baekeland Medal (1999)
 Piero–Pino Prize (1999)
 Van't Hoff Prize (1998)
 Thieme-IUPAC Prize in Synthetic Organic Chemistry (1996)
 Fluka "Reagent of the Year" Prize (1994)
 ACS Cope Scholar Award (1993)
 Zeneca Chemistry Award (1993)
 Pfizer Young Faculty Award for Synthetic Organic Chemistry (1993)
 Alfred P. Sloan Foundation Fellowship (1992)
 Camille and Henry Dreyfus Teacher-Scholar Award (1992)
 Packard Fellowship (1991)
 NSF Presidential Young Investigator Award (1990)

References

External links 
 Jacobsen Group at Harvard

1960 births
Living people

21st-century American chemists
Harvard University faculty
University of California, Berkeley alumni
New York University alumni
American people of Cuban descent